Yirrkala is a small community in East Arnhem Region, Northern Territory, Australia,  southeast of the large mining town of Nhulunbuy, on the Gove Peninsula in Arnhem Land. Its population comprises predominantly Aboriginal Australians of the Yolngu people, and it is also home to a number of Mission Aviation Fellowship pilots and engineers based in Arnhem Land, providing air transport services.

History 
There has been an Aboriginal community at Yirrkala throughout recorded history, but the community increased enormously in size when Yirrkala mission was founded in 1935.

Land rights

Yirrkala played a pivotal role in the development of the relationship between Indigenous and non-Indigenous Australians when the document Bark Petition was created at Yirrkala in 1963 and sent to the Federal Government to protest at the Prime Minister's announcement that a parcel of their land was to be sold to a bauxite mining company. Although the petition itself was unsuccessful in the sense that the bauxite mining at Nhulunbuy went ahead as planned, it alerted non-Indigenous Australians to the need for Indigenous representation in such decisions, and prompted a government report recommending payment of compensation, protection of sacred sites, creation of a permanent parliamentary standing committee to scrutinise developments at Yirrkala, and also acknowledged the Indigenous people's moral right to their lands. The Bark Petition is on display in the Parliament House in Canberra.

Outstation status
The settlement was funded as an outstation during the 1980s.

Governance and people
 the East Arnhem Regional Council is the local government for Yirrkala, which is in the council's Gumurr Miwatj Ward. It consults with Yirrkala Mala Leaders Association, consisting of 12 elected community members.

The Northern Land Council is the land council to the community, responsible for matters under the Aboriginal Land Rights (Northern Territory) Act 1976.

Culture

Yirrkala is home to a number of leading Indigenous artists, whose traditional Aboriginal art, particularly bark painting, can be found in art galleries around the world, and whose work frequently wins awards such as the Telstra National Aboriginal and Torres Strait Islander Art Awards. Their work is available to the public from the Buku-Larrnggay Mulka Art Centre and Museum and also from the YBE art centre. Pioneer bark painters from this region the National Museum of Australia consider old masters include Mithinarri Gurruwiwi, Birrikitji Gumana and Mawalan Marika.

It is also a traditional home of the Yidaki (didgeridoo), and some of the world's finest didgeridoos are still made at Yirrkala.

Buku-Larrnggay Mulka Centre
The Buku-Larrnggay Mulka Centre, formerly Buku-Larrŋgay Arts  and also known as the Buku-Larrnggay Mulka Art Centre and Museum, is a world-renowned centre, with well-known artists such as Nyapanyapa Yunupingu based there. It is often referred to as Buku for short.

The inspiration for the gallery arose in the 1960s, when Narritjin Maymuru set up his own gallery on the beachfront.

In 1976 Buku-Larrŋgay Arts was established by local artists in the old Mission health centre, after missionaries had left and as the Aboriginal land rights and Homeland movements gathered pace. A new museum was built in 1988 using a Bicentenary grant, and this now contains a collection created in the 1970s which illustrates clan law. It also houses the message sticks which, after delivery by the anthropologist Donald Thomson were instrumental in establishing peaceful talks during the Caledon Bay crisis in 1935.

In 1996, extra gallery spaces and a screen print studio were built, and in 2007, The Mulka Project was added. This project comprises a collection of many thousands of historical images and films, and continues to create new digital art and images.

The current centre, greatly expanded, comprises two divisions: the Yirrkala Art Centre, which represents the artists exhibiting and selling contemporary art, and The Mulka Project, which incorporates the museum. It is known for its production of bark paintings, weaving in natural fibres, larrakitj (memorial poles), yidaki, and many other forms of art.

There is a stage called the Roy Marika Stage at the centre, which is used for the annual Yarrapay Festival. In June 2021, the festival was directed by Witiyana Marika, and featured the Andrew Gurruwiwi Band, Yothu Yindi, Yirrmal, and East Journey.

Artists, works and exhibitions
The historic Yirrkala Church Panels were created in 1963 by Yolngu elders  of the Dhuwa moiety (including Mawalan Marika, Wandjuk Marika and Mithinarri Gurruwiwi), who painted one sheet with their major ancestral narratives and clan designs, and eight elders of the Yirritja moiety, including Mungurrawuy Yunupingu, Birrikitji Gumana and Narritjin Maymuru, who painted the other sheet with Yirritja designs. They were discarded by the church in 1974, but were salvaged by Buku-Larrnggay in 1978. On 27 February 1998 they were unveiled by then prime minister John Howard, and were described by Yolŋu leaders as "Title Deeds which establish the legal tenure for each of our traditional clan estates".

The  National Gallery of Victoria in Melbourne has been collecting bark paintings by Buku artists for over 20 years, which are included in its significant collection of work by Yolŋu women artists.

Women artists who have worked at the centre include five sisters: Nancy Gaymala Yunupingu, Gulumbu Yunupingu, Barrupu Yunupingu, Nyapanyapa Yunupingu, and Eunice Djerrkngu Yunupingu; as well as Dhuwarrwarr Marika; Malaluba Gumana; Naminapu Maymuru-White; Nonggirrnga Marawili; and Dhambit Mununggurr; and Margaret Wirrpanda. Their work was included in a December 2021 – April 2022 exhibition at the NGV, called Bark Ladies: Eleven Artists from Yirrkala.

Education
At Yirrkala School, formerly Yirrkala Community School, renamed Yirrkala Community Education Centre or Yirrkala CEC after it became a location of one of the trial Community Education Centres (CEC) in 1988, students undertake a method of bilingual studies dubbed "both ways", incorporating a cultural curriculum called Galtha Rom, meaning cultural lessons. Despite a 2009 Northern Territory Government order to teach English for the first four hours each day, the school continued to teach in its own way, with the child's first language, Yolngu Matha, taught alongside English. The method has proven effective against reducing the drop-out rate, and in 2020 eight students were the first in their community to graduate year 12 with scores enabling them to attend university. Yirrkala School and its sister school, Laynhapuy Homelands School, are now being looked to as models for learning in remote traditional communities.

Artist and teacher-linguist Yalmay Marika Yunupingu, one of the famous Marika family of north-east Arnhem Land, daughter of artist Mathaman Marika, was appointed senior teacher at the school in 2004, and continues to work there . She was awarded the Northern Territory Government's Teaching Excellence Award in the Remote Primary category for her work at Yirrkala, and her artwork has featured in exhibitions in Australia and the US.

Heritage listings 

Yirrkala has a number of heritage-listed sites, including:

 Wurrwurrwuy stone arrangements

Notable people

 Roy Marika (1925–93), councillor and artist
 Wandjuk Marika (1927–1987), artist, actor, Indigenous rights activist
Nonggirrnga Marawili (c.1938), painter
Nyapanyapa Yunupingu (c.1945), painter
 Galarrwuy Yunupingu (1948–), land rights activist and chair, Northern Land Council
 Gatjil Djerrkura (1949–2004), ceremonial leader
 Banduk Marika (1954–2021), artist
 Mandawuy Yunupingu (1956–2013), musician and educator
Kathy Balngayngu Marika (1957-), dancer
 Raymattja Marika (c.1959–2008), scholar, educator, linguist and cultural advocate
 Yothu Yindi (1986–2000), rock band
 Nathan Djerrkura (1988–), Australian rules footballer
 Yirrmal Marika (1993–), Australian singer
 Maminydjama Maymuru (1997–), model
 Timmy Burarrwanga, businessman and cultural leader
 Kwame Yeboah (born 1994 in Yirrkala), professional football player for the Western Sydney Wanderers
Wukun Wanambi

References

Further reading

Arnhem Land
Towns in the Northern Territory
Aboriginal communities in the Northern Territory